Les Grandes Personnes is a 2008 French-Swedish comedy-drama film directed by Anna Novion. It was screened in the International Critics' Week section at the 2008 Cannes Film Festival.

Cast 
 Jean-Pierre Darroussin as Albert 
 Anaïs Demoustier as Jeanne 
 Judith Henry as Christine 
 Lia Boysen as Anika
 Jakob Eklund as Per 
 Anastasios Soulis as Magnus 
 Björn Gustafsson as Johan 
 Mirja Turestedt as Waitress
 Dag Malmberg as Magnus's father
 Åsa Karlin as Magnus's mother

Accolades

References

External links 
 

2008 films
2008 comedy-drama films
2000s French-language films
2000s Swedish-language films
2000s English-language films
French comedy-drama films
Swedish comedy-drama films
2008 directorial debut films
2008 multilingual films
French multilingual films
Swedish multilingual films
2000s French films
2000s Swedish films